Stroiești is a village in the Rîbnița District of Transnistria, Moldova, located midway between Rîbnița and Rașcov. It is the site of the Church of St. Michael the Archangel, an Orthodox church.

References

Villages of Transnistria
Bratslav Voivodeship
Olgopolsky Uyezd
Rîbnița District